Ambeth R. Ocampo (born in Manila, 1961) is a Filipino public historian, academic, cultural administrator, journalist, author, and independent curator. He is best known for his definitive writings about Philippines' national hero José Rizal and on topics on Philippine history and Philippine art through Looking Back, his bi-weekly editorial page column in the Philippine Daily Inquirer.

He served as Chairman of the National Historical Commission of the Philippines from 2002 until 2011 and concurrently chairman of the National Commission for Culture and the Arts from 2005 to 2007.

Early life and education
Ocampo was born in Manila in 1961. He received his primary and secondary education at the Basic Education Department of Ateneo de Manila University. He subsequently obtained his undergraduate and masteral degrees in Philippine Studies from the De La Salle University in 1989 and 1991. His undergraduate thesis Food in Pampango Culture centered on Kapampangan cuisine, while his masteral thesis centered on his recovery of the third unfinished novel of José Rizal, Makamisa during his term as a consultant to the National Library of the Philippines later published as Makamisa: The Search for Rizal's Third Novel in 1992.

He took graduate courses at the University of the Philippines Diliman, and later read for a doctorate in Southeast Asian History at the University of London School of Oriental and African Studies (SOAS). He abandoned his London postgraduate studies in 1993, when he entered the Our Lady of Montserrat Abbey as Benedictine monk under the monastic name Dom. Ignacio Maria Ocampo, O.S.B. He subsequently left the monastery in 1997.

Career

Writings

Looking Back column
Ocampo began writing for Weekend Magazine, the Sunday supplement of the Philippine Daily Express in 1985 and subsequently joined its editorial staff as associate editor. His column Looking Back first appeared in the Philippine Daily Globe from 1987 to 1990, and compilations of these columns saw new life as his two bestselling books; namely, the Looking Back series and Rizal Without the Overcoat that was awarded the National Book Award for essay in 1990. At the invitation of Letty Jimenez Magsanoc and Eugenia D. Apostol, Ocampo's Daily Globe column moved to the Philippine Daily Inquirer in 1990, where it appears twice weekly on the Opinion-Editorial page.

Since 1986, Ocampo has published more than 35 books and other publications that have consisted of compilations of his various essays, and writings on Philippine history, arts, and culture. Most of his published works have focused on the life and works of the Philippine nationalist and martyr, Jose Rizal with Rizal Without the Overcoat going into six editions since its first publication in 1990. He has also annotated the second edition of Rizal in Saga: A Life for Student Fans written by the late National Artist Nick Joaquin that includes newly uncovered research material collated by Ocampo and photographs from his private collection in 2021.

Ocampo has also written on the history of Filipino cuisine that sprung from his undergraduate thesis Food in Pampango Culture published in 1989. In 2001, he also co-authored an essay Grande Cuisine in the Philippines with Philippine food historian and academic Doreen Fernandez that was subsequently published on an issue of the British food academic journal Petits Propos Culinaires.

In addition, he has published monographs on other historical and cultural figures in Philippine history, including musical composer Nicanor Abelardo, historian Teodoro Agoncillo and Teodora Alonso, the mother of Rizal, amongst others.

Ocampo has written about on the history of foreign relations of the Philippines including France, Japan, Mexico and Singapore.

When Ocampo was appointed chairman of the National Historical Institute (present-day National Historical Commission of the Philippines) in 2002 and later elected chair of the National Commission for Culture and the Arts (NCCA) in 2005, then-President Gloria Macapagal Arroyo declared that she was an ardent reader of his newspaper column, commending his writings because he "makes history so approachable." Some academics have critiqued Ocampo for his populist approach to historiography. In response, Ocampo has since released two compilations of his public lectures, Meaning and History focused on Jose Rizal and Bones of Contention on Andres Bonifacio both published in 2001, complete with citations and footnotes. Nevertheless, Ocampo is considered one of the most prominent Philippine historians.

In recent years, he has written numerous articles on the diaries of former Philippine President and dictator Ferdinand E. Marcos compiling all known extant entries collated from six different sources, and annotating these. The diaries have yet to be published in entirety. In 2021, his fifteenth compilation of his columns of his Looking Back series written based on the diaries of Marcos and the legacies of the martial law regime titled Martial Law was published becoming his first publication on Philippine contemporary history.

In 2022, Ocampo became the subject of a massive troll attack from social media influencers with ties to President Bongbong Marcos after commenting on the controversial remarks of actress Ella Cruz who described Philippine history as "tsismis" (gossip), calling it "filtered" and "biased", that drew widespread condemnation on social media. In response, academic circles composed of leading Philippine historians and academics led by National Artist for Literature Virgilio S. Almario, Xiao Chua, Francis Gealogo and others denounced the attack on Ocampo and issued messages in support of the historian due to the ongoing attempts of historical distortion on martial law regime of the late dictator.

Art historian and curator

Ocampo presently sits on the advisory boards of the Ateneo Art Gallery, the Ayala Museum, the BenCab Museum, the Lopez Museum, and the President Elpidio Quirino Foundation.

Ocampo has also written several essays and monographs on Philippine art, beginning with his first book on Philippine modern impressionist painter Emilio Aguilar Cruz titled The Paintings of E. Aguilar Cruz published in 1986. In 2019, a new version of the said book was revised, expanded, and published as E. Aguilar Cruz: The Writer as Painter.

Since then, Ocampo has worked as an independent art curator and has curated several landmark artist retrospectives and exhibitions on Philippine visual artists including Juan Luna, Fernando Amorsolo, Guillermo Tolentino, Romulo Galicano, Arturo Luz, Benedicto Cabrera and Elmer Borlongan. He has co-written two publications on the biography and art of several contemporary artists, including those of Spanish-Philippine artist Fernando Zóbel and visual artist and fashion designer Mark Lewis Lim Higgins.

As an art historian, Ocampo has written several critiques on the controversies surrounding the Philippine art market. In 1985, in an essay titled Are these fake Rizal drawings?, he questioned the authenticity of drawings that were purportedly done by Rizal that were used as visual aids in the noted biography on the Philippine nationalist: José Rizal: Filipino Doctor and Patriot by José Baron Fernandez. The issue later resurfaced in 1990, when Ocampo engaged in a heated word war with former Philippine politician Manuel Morato who published these drawings in the said book.

Since then, Ocampo has continued in providing commentaries on other issues on Philippine art, including the 2019 sale of Camote Diggers considered as the last artwork by National Artist Botong Francisco and the provenance of an boceto of the Spoliarium by Juan Luna in 2018.

Consequently, Ocampo has also conducted extensive research on Philippine antiquities including Christian art, Southeast Asian ceramics, maps, and furniture. Several of his essays were compiled in the ninth compilation of his Looking Back series titled Demonyo Tables: History in Artifacts published in 2015.

Since 2011, Ocampo has delivered public lectures on Philippine history and culture primarily at the Ayala Museum known as the History Comes Alive series to sold-out crowds.

Government service

Cultural administrator

From 1987 until 1992, Ocampo served as a consultant to the National Library of the Philippines (NLP) with a concurrent capacity as a member of the National Committee on Libraries and Information Services (NCLIS) and the National Committee on Monuments and Sites (NCMS) under the Presidential Commission on Culture and the Arts (the present-day National Commission for Culture and the Arts (NCCA)). During his term at the National Library, he recovered the unpublished manuscripts of Rizal's unfinished novel Makamisa in 1987 and later worked on the bibliographic catalog of papers, writings and documents related to Rizal held in the vault of the National Library.

In 1999, Ocampo was appointed board member of the National Historical Institute (present-day National Historical Commission of the Philippines (NHCP)) by President Joseph Estrada. Subsequently, in 2002, he was appointed chairman by President Gloria Macapagal Arroyo. During his term as its chairman, Ocampo weathered criticism over attempts to enforce provisions of the existing Flag and Heraldic Code of the Philippines by reminding artists singing the Philippine national anthem during international boxing matches of the proper way to sing the anthem, and his controversial decision to paint the Rizal clan house green – to remind Filipinos that the word "Rizal" came from "ricial" meaning a green field ready for harvest.

As chairman of the NHCP, Ocampo served as a ex officio board member in the National Commission for Culture and the Arts (NCCA), the official government agency for culture in the Philippines. Later on, he was elected as its chairman serving from 2005 to 2007. During that time, he signed cultural agreements and executive programs on culture and heritage on behalf of the Philippines with France, Mexico, Pakistan, the People's Republic of China, and North Korea.

Member of the Numismatic Committee 
From 2002 to 2011, Ocampo served as a member of the Numismatic Committee of the Bangko Sentral ng Pilipinas that deliberated on the redesign of banknotes and coins in the Philippines. Ocampo and other members of the Numismatic Committee deliberated on the designs of the New Generation Currency Series including the redesign of the five hundred-peso banknotes which featured the portraits of Philippine opposition leader Benigno Aquino Jr. and his wife, President Corazon Aquino following national clamor after the death and funeral of the late President in 2009.

Ocampo has written extensively on the history of the Philippine peso in a series of articles, particularly on the controversies surrounding currency design and its political context. In 2020, the Bangko Sentral ng Pilipinas published Ocampo's Yaman: The History and Heritage in Philippine Money, a coffee table book on the numismatic collection of the Philippine central bank.

In academia

Ocampo is Horacio de la Costa Professor of History and the Humanities at the Ateneo de Manila University. He was former Chairman of the Department of History, School of Social Sciences in the Ateneo de Manila University. He is presently Visiting Professor of Philippine Studies at the University of Michigan Center for Southeast Asian Studies. He previously served as a professorial lecturer in the Department of Filipino and Philippine Literature of the College of Arts and Letters in the University of the Philippines Diliman from 1989 until 2010 and served on the Board of Regents of the Universidad de Manila (formerly City College of Manila), where he served as its president and vice president for academic affairs from 1996 to 1998. He has also held previous appointments at the De La Salle University, Far Eastern University, and San Beda College. He has previously held endowed professorial chairs at the City College of Manila, now Unibersidad ng Maynila and the Polytechnic University of the Philippines.

He has held appointments as visiting research fellow in Kyoto University, and Chulalongkorn University, Bangkok. He was visiting professor at Sophia University, Tokyo, where he taught courses on Philippine history and culture from 2012 to 2014 he remains a Visiting Research Fellow at the Sophia University Institute of Asian Studies.

His personal and official papers, notes, and correspondence are deposited in the University of the Philippines Archives in Diliman, Quezon City, Philippines.

A collector of Filipiniana, his extensive library and collection is divided between his home in Makati; Holy Angel University, Angeles, Pampanga; and the Center for Southeast Asian Studies Library in Kyoto University.

Part of his collection of Philippine Art was bequeathed to the Ateneo Art Gallery with one of its wings renamed as the Ambeth R. Ocampo Gallery.

Honors, awards, and decorations

Ocampo has won three National Book Awards in these categories: Essay, Literary History, and Bibliography. He was awarded the Premio Manuel Bernabe from the Centro Cultural de la Embajada de Espana en Filipinas and a Premio Quijano de Manila from the Instituto Cervantes Manila. He was elected National Fellow for Essay by the University of the Philippines Creative Writing Center (1995–1996).

He has been conferred the rank of Knight Grand Officer (K.G.O.R.) of the Order of the Knights of Rizal in December 2018, and Order of Civil Merit with the rank of Encomienda (Commander) conferred by the Kingdom of Spain in December 2007.

In June 2008, he was conferred the rank of Officier in the Ordre des Arts et Lettres by the Republic of France for his contributions to the arts and letters as a writer, academic, and cultural administrator, and for his support of cultural exchanges between the Philippines and France.

In recognition of his work in cultural administration and his contributions to Philippine history, the Polytechnic University of the Philippines conferred on him the degree of Doctor of Public Administration, honoris causa, in December 2008.

In 2010, he was conferred one of the highest civilian awards of the Philippines, the Order of Lakandula with the rank of Bayani for his contributions in cultural administration, the popularization of Philippine history, and for having served as chairman of the National Historical Institute (present-day, the National Historical Commission of the Philippines) from 2002 to 2010, and concurrent chairman of the National Commission for Culture and the Arts (NCCA) from 2005 until 2007 without compensation.

In December 2013, during the state visit of President Benigno Aquino III to Tokyo, Ocampo was conferred the Presidential Medal of Merit whose citation reads, "for his achievements as a scholar, teacher, and in recognition of his writings through which he popularized Philippine history, art and culture thus bringing these aspects of our national identity closer to the people."

In September 2016, Ocampo was awarded the prestigious Fukuoka Prize (Academic) for his contributions to Philippine history and culture being the fifth Filipino to be so honored with the recognition.

Honours

National honours
 : Grand Cross of the Order of Lakandula with Rank of Bayani (2010)
 : Presidential Medal of Merit (2013)
 : Knight Grand Officer (K.G.O.R) in the Order of the Knights of Rizal (2018)

Foreign honours
 : Order of Civil Merit with the Rank of Commander (Encomienda) (2007)
 : Ordre des Arts et des Lettres with the Rank of Officier (2008)

Awards 
 : National Book Award (Essay) (1990)
 : Philippine National Book Award (Literary History) (1992)
 : Philippine National Book Award (Bibliography) (1993)
 : Fukuoka Academic Prize (2016)

Honorary degrees 
 : Polytechnic University of the Philippines: Public Administration (2008)

Bibliography 
Books and Publications
 The Paintings of E. Aguilar Cruz (1986)
 Ang Buhay at Musika ni Maestro Nicanor Abelardo (The Life and Music of Maestro Nicanor Abelardo) (1987)
 Lupang Hinirang: Alay ni Amorsolo (1989) (co-authored with Carmen Aquino-Sarmiento)
 The Juan Luna Collection: A Bequest to the Filipino People (1990)
 Looking Back (1990)
 Rizal Without the Overcoat (1990)
 Makamisa: The Search for Rizal's Third Novel (1992)
 Aguinaldo's Breakfast (1993)
 A Calendar of Rizaliana in the Vault of the Philippine National Library (1993)
 Bonifacio's Bolo (1995)
 Teodora Alonso (1995)
 Talking History: Conversations with Teodoro A. Agoncillo (1995)
 Mabini's Ghost (1995)	
 Luna's Moustache (1997)	
 Three Rizal Lectures (1997)
 The Centennial Countdown (1998)
 R. Galicano (2000) (co-authored with Rod. Paras-Perez) 
 Meaning and History: The Rizal Lectures (2001)
 Bones of Contention: The Bonifacio Lectures (2001)
 Zero-In: Private Art, Public Lives (2002) (co-authored with Marian Pastor Roces and Leovino Ma. Garcia) 
 Rizal the Scientist: Proceedings of a Seminar in the Commemoration of the Rizal Centennial (1896) June 20, 1997 (2002) (co-editor with Andrew Gonzalez)
 Arturo Luz: Sculptures (2004)
 60 Years and Bon Vivant: Philippine-French Relations (2008) (as editor)
 101 Stories of the Philippine Revolution (2008)	
 Philippines - Mexico Historical Relations: Proceedings of the Symposium held at the National Museum of the Philippines on November 16–17, 2006 (2010) (as editor)
 Looking Back: Looking Back 1 (2010)	
 Dirty Dancing: Looking Back 2 (2010)	
 Death by Garrote: Looking Back 3 (2010)
 Chulalongkorn's Elephants: The Philippines in Asian History: Looking Back 4 (2011)
 The Diorama Experience of Philippine History (2012) (co-authored with Jesus T. Peralta and Felice Noelle Rodriguez)
 Rizal's Teeth, Bonifacio's Bones: Looking Back 5 (2012)	
 Prehistoric Philippines: Looking Back 6 (2012)	
 Storm Chasers: Looking Back 7 (2014)	
 Virgin of Balintawak: Looking Back 8 (2014)
 The Jim and Reed Pfeufer Collection: A Four-Decade Friendship with Fernando Zóbel (2015) (co-authored with John Seed)
 Demonyo Tables: History in Artifacts: Looking Back 9 (2015)	
 Two Lunas, Two Mabinis: Looking Back 10 (2015)	
 History and Heritage of the Kudan: The Official Residence of the Philippine Ambassador of Japan (2015)
 BenCab Portraits (2015)	
 Independence X6: Looking Back 11 (2016)
 Quezon's Sukiyaki: Looking Back 12 (2016)
 Guns of the Katipunan: Looking Back 13 (2017)
 Images of Nation: Arturo Luz – First Light (2018)
 Pintôkyo International (2018) (co-authored with Carlomar Arcangel Daoana and Joven Cuanang)
 Gold in Our Veins: Mark Lewis Lim Higgins (2019) (co-authored with Ditas R. Samson and David A. Henkel)
 E. Aguilar Cruz: The Writer as Painter (2019)
 Dirty Ice Cream: Looking Back 14 (2020)
 Yaman: The History and Heritage in Philippine Money (2020)
 Martial Law: Looking Back 15 (2021)
 Queridas de Rizal: Looking Back 16 (2021)
 Rizal in Saga: A Life For Student Fans by Nick Joaquin (2021) (as annotator)

Contributor in Books and Other Publications
 A Home to the Stars (1987, Registrar) (co-authored with Annie Delgado-Ringor)
 2000 Years of Vatican Treasures:“…And They Will Come from Afar” (1994) (co-authored with Gabriel Casal and edited by Giovanni Morello).
 In the Service of Filipino Culture: A Festschrift for Very Rev. Bernardo Ma. Perez, O.S.B. (1994, Scientia) (as editor)
 Bones of Contention: Relics, Memory and Andres Bonifacio (1998, Amerasia Journal)
 Centennial Commemorative Lectures 1998 (1998) (edited by Marian Pastor Roces)
 Rizal's Morga and Philippine History (1998, Philippine Studies)
 The Fookien Times: Philippines Yearbook (1998)
 The Likhaan Anthology of Philippine Literature in English from 1900 to the Present (1998)  (edited by Gémino Abad)
 Philippine Presidents: 100 Years (1999) (edited by Rosario M. Cortes)
 Feasts and Feats: Festschrift for Doreen G. Fernandez (2000) (edited by Jonathan Chua)
 Pasig: River of Life (2000) (co-authored by Reynaldo G. Alejandro and Alfred A. Yuson) 
 Philippine Cultural and Artistic Landmarks of the Past Millennium (2000) (edited by Jaime C. Laya)
 Philippine Legislature: 100 Years (2000) (edited by Cesar P. Pobre)
 Grande Cuisine in the Philippines (2001, Petits Propos Culinaires) (co-authored with Doreen G. Fernandez) 
 Malate: A Matter of Taste (2001)
 Laguna de Bay: The Living Lake (2002) (edited by Reynaldo G. Alejandro) 
 Año Filipinas-España 2006/Taon ng Filipinas-Espanya (2006)
 Opinion Writers: Down from the Hill, Through the Valleys, Into the Plains (2007, Budhi) (co-authored with Joaquin Bernas S.J. and Maximo Soliven) Las Damas Romanas by Juan Luna y Novicio (2008, Christie's)
 A Passage to Asia: 25 Centuries of Exchange between Asia and Europe (2010) (edited by Jan van Alphen)
 Connecting Flights: Filipinos Write from Elsewhere (2010) (edited by Ruel S. De Vera) 
 Historical Agencies: National Hysterical Institute (2010, Historical Bulletin)
 Culture, Power and Practices: The Globalization of Culture and its Implications for Asian Regional Transformations - the work of the 2010/2011 API Fellows (2011)
 Entre España y Filipinas: José Rizal, Escritor (2011)
 The Anvil José Rizal Reader: On the Occasion of the Sesquicentennial of His Birth (1861-2011) (2011) (edited by Ani V. Habulan)
 Motherhood Statements (2014) (edited by Rica Bolipata-Santos and Cyan Abad-Jugo)
 The Contributions of 2014 ALFP Fellows Towards Growth and Development (2014) (edited by Vishalache Balakrishnan)
 Jabali by José Rizal (2016, León Gallery)
 Between Worlds: Raden Saleh and Juan Luna (2017) (edited by Russell Storer, Clarissa Chikiamco & Syed Muhammad Hafiz) 
 Lorenzana: Archival Collection (2017) (edited by Michelle Yun)
 My BenCab: Collectors Tell Their Stories (2018) (edited by Thelma Sioson San Juan)
 Hans Christian Andersen and José Rizal: from Denmark to the Philippines (2018) (edited by Jan Top Christensen)
 Insulae Indiae Orientalis (2018) (edited by Rudolf J. H. Lietz)
 Rizal+ (edited by Alfred A. Yuson) (2018)
 Drugs and Philippine Society (2021) (edited by Gideon Lasco)
 50 Years of Golden Friendship: Philippines-Singapore (2021) (edited by Joseph del Mundo Yap)
 E. Aguilar Cruz: Stories and Sketches Drawn from Memory'' (2022) (edited by Larry J. Cruz)

References

External links
 
 
 Ateneo de Mania faculty page
 Official Facebook Page of Ambeth R. Ocampo

Filipino art historians
Filipino columnists
21st-century Filipino writers
Kapampangan people
People from Pampanga
Ateneo de Manila University alumni
Academic staff of Ateneo de Manila University
De La Salle University alumni
Grand Crosses of the Order of Lakandula
Officiers of the Ordre des Arts et des Lettres
Living people
1961 births
University of the Philippines Diliman alumni
Philippine Daily Inquirer people
Recipients of the Presidential Medal of Merit (Philippines)
Academic staff of the University of the Philippines Diliman
21st-century Filipino historians